Xyris torta, the slender yelloweyed grass, is a North American species of flowering plants in the yellow-eyed-grass family. It is widespread in the central and eastern United States from New Hampshire to Georgia, west as far as Minnesota, Nebraska, and eastern Texas.

Xyris torta is a perennial herb with a stem up to 100 cm (40 inches) tall with long, narrow twisted leaves up to 50 cm (20 inches) long but generally less than 5 mm (0.2 inches) wide.

References

External links
Photo of herbarium specimen at Missouri Botanical Garden, collected in Missouri in 1993
Go Botany, New England Wildflower Society
Delaware Wildflowers
Alabama Plant Atlas

torta
Plants described in 1819
Flora of the United States